The Cape Fear Civil War Shipwreck Discontiguous District is a historic district encompassing a collection of shipwrecks in the Cape Fear area of southeastern North Carolina.  The district includes several clusters of underwater archaeological resources associated with as many as 21 shipwrecks dating to the American Civil War.  The district was listed on the National Register of Historic Places in 1985.

List of shipwrecks
 Ranger
 Ella
 
 Beauregard
 Sophia
 Wild Dayrell
 Phantom
 Douro
 Hebe
 Venus
 Lynx
 
 Bendigo
 Elizabeth
 Stormy Petrel
 
 Arabian
 Louisiana
 Condor
 CSS Raleigh
 Modern Greece
 one unknown vessel (site 0007NEI)

See also
National Register of Historic Places listings in Brunswick County, North Carolina
National Register of Historic Places listings in New Hanover County, North Carolina

References

Shipwrecks on the National Register of Historic Places in North Carolina
Historic districts on the National Register of Historic Places in North Carolina
National Register of Historic Places in New Hanover County, North Carolina
National Register of Historic Places in Brunswick County, North Carolina
National Register of Historic Places in Pender County, North Carolina
American Civil War on the National Register of Historic Places